This page highlights the animated feature films nominated for or won Academy Awards aside from the Best Animated Feature category.

Feature film categories

Best Picture
Animated feature films were nominated for Best Picture in only three cases: 1991, 2009 and 2010. Beauty and the Beast is the only animated-feature film Best Picture nominee before the inception of Best Animated Feature and in the five-nominee format. Up and Toy Story 3 were both nominated after the inception of the animated feature category and in the expanded ten-nominee format.

Best International Feature Film
Only two animated films have been nominated in the Best International Feature Film category.

Best Documentary Feature 
Only one animated film has been nominated in the Best Documentary Feature category.

Writing (screenplay) categories

Best Original Screenplay

Best Adapted Screenplay

Music awards

Best Original Score

Best Original Song
Since the category's inception in 1934, twelve animated films have won this music category, with Disney winning eleven (three with Pixar), and DreamWorks winning one. Beauty and the Beast (1991) and The Lion King (1994) both had three nominations in this category, the first and second films to do so.

Wet Blanket Policy, a 1948 Woody Woodpecker short cartoon, was also nominated for Best Original Song. "The Woody Woodpecker" song was written by George Tibbles and Ramey Idriess and was nominated for the 21st Academy Awards (21st). It is the only animated short subject to be nominated in a traditionally feature film category.

In addition of outside of Disney and Pixar theatrical films, The Prince of Egypt (1998) marks their first time and is the only film for DreamWorks Animation to win an award category as of 2021.

Sound categories

Best Sound Editing

Best Sound Mixing

Best Sound

Visual Effects

With the nomination of The Lion King in 2019, three animated films are nominated for Best Visual Effects.

Honorary Awards and Special Achievement Awards
Honorary Awards and Special Achievement Award are given to celebrate noted achievements in motion picture arts.

Honorary Awards
A handful of the honorary award recipients are awarded in their achievements in animated feature films.

Special Achievement Awards

Live-action/animated films 
Live-action animated film blends various traditional animation or computer animation in live action films.

Competitive awards

Honorary awards
{| class="wikitable" width="80%"
|-
! width="5%" style="background:#F0E68C| Year
! width="15%" style="background:#F0E68C| Award Recipient(s)
! width="25%" style="background:#F0E68C| Citation
|-
| align="center"| 1946(20th)
| James Baskett
| "for his able and heart-warming characterization of Uncle Remus, friend and story teller to the children of the world in Walt Disney's Song of the South"
|-
| align="center"| 1949(22nd)
| Bobby Driscoll
| "as the outstanding juvenile actor of 1949" (for his roles in So Dear to My Heart and The Window)
|}

 Notes 

 Beauty and the Beast (1991) and WALL-E (2008) have 6 nominations, both shares their most nominations for an animated film.
Are the first and only animated films to be nominated in each categories (and sometimes win) without Disney and Pixar's involvement.
 The Polar Express (2004) nominates two technical nominations, especially Best Sound Editing and Mixing.
 The Prince of Egypt (1998) win Best Original Song.Kubo and the Two Strings (2016) nominates Best Visual Effects.Shrek (2001) nominates Best Adapted Screenplay.
Also some of the first adult animated films to be nominated in each categories.
 The Triplets of Belleville (2003) is rated PG-13 by the MPAA, the first PG-13 rated to be nominated for Best Animated Feature and Original Song.
 Isle of Dogs (2018) is rated PG-13 by the MPAA, the first PG-13 rated to be nominated for Best Original Score.
 South Park: Bigger, Longer & Uncut (1999) is rated R by the MPAA, the first R-rated to be nominated for Best Original Song.
 Waltz with Bashir (2008) is rated R by the MPAA, the first to be nominated for Best Foreign Language Film, representing Israel.
 Anomalisa'' (2015) is rated R by the MPAA, the first R-rated to be nominated for Best Animated Feature.

References

Animated feature films
Lists of animated films